Monaco competed at the 1936 Summer Olympics in Berlin, Germany.  The nation returned to the Olympic Games after missing the 1932 Summer Olympics. Eight competitors, all men, took part in five events in two sports.

Shooting

Six shooters represented Monaco in 1936.

25 m rapid fire pistol
 Roger Abel
 Michel Ravarino
 Herman Schultz

50 m pistol
 Herman Schultz
 Louis Briano
 Victor Bonafède

50 m rifle, prone
 Michel Ravarino
 Roger Abel
 Pierre Marsan

Art competitions

References

External links
Official Olympic Reports

Nations at the 1936 Summer Olympics
1936 Summer Olympics
Summer Olympics